Goleminov Point (‘Goleminov Nos’ \go-le-'mi-nov 'nos\) is the rocky point on the northwest coast of Alexander Island in Antarctica projecting 400 m westwards into Lazarev Bay southeast of the terminus of Manolov Glacier.

The feature is named after the Bulgarian composer Marin Goleminov (1908-2000).

Location
British mapping in 1971.

Maps
 British Antarctic Territory. Scale 1:200000 topographic map. DOS 610 – W 69 70. Tolworth, UK, 1971
 Antarctic Digital Database (ADD). Scale 1:250000 topographic map of Antarctica. Scientific Committee on Antarctic Research (SCAR). Since 1993, regularly upgraded and updated

References
 Bulgarian Antarctic Gazetteer. Antarctic Place-names Commission. (details in Bulgarian, basic data in English)
 Goleminov Point. SCAR Composite Gazetteer of Antarctica

External links
 Goleminov Point. Copernix satellite image

Headlands of Alexander Island
Bulgaria and the Antarctic